The Busy Beavers is a 1931 Silly Symphonies animated film, directed by Burt Gillett.

Plot
The short shows a community of beavers building their dam and soon shows one particular beaver trying to save it when it is threatened by a flash flood.

Reception
Variety (July 14, 1931): "One of the Silly Symphonies and among the better of that group. At the Roxy, shown on the wide screen, the cartoon took on added attractiveness. Good anywhere. Runs with a sense of continuity which other cartoons fail to get despite the fact that only the quack-quack noises of the inked beavers and some interpolating sounds are heard by the customers. One good moment is when a cloudburst pummels one of the beavers Another is where a tree falls on one of them. However, he stays alive to be razzed by a plucked owl for a laugh finish."

The Film Daily (July 19, 1931): "Walt Disney made a 'knock-out' when he produced this Silly Symphony. Gags that are really new, animation that is smooth and clever and synchrony that never misses a beat. Disney has taken a theme which shows beavers building a dam as only cartooned beavers can do it. It finishes with a flood and one lone beaver attempting to save the dam from destruction. The reel is fast, funny and fine."

Home media
The short was released on December 4, 2001, on Walt Disney Treasures: Silly Symphonies - The Historic Musical Animated Classics.

References

External links
 
 

American animated short films
1931 short films
1930s Disney animated short films
Silly Symphonies
1931 animated films
Films directed by Burt Gillett
Films produced by Walt Disney
American black-and-white films
Columbia Pictures animated short films
Columbia Pictures short films
Animated films about mammals
Films about rodents
Films scored by Frank Churchill
Fictional beavers
Animated films without speech
Flood films